Gatta is a surname. Notable people with the surname include:

Bartolomeo della Gatta (1448–1502), Italian painter, illuminator, and architect
Claudia La Gatta (born 1979), Venezuelan actress and model
Giuseppe Gatta (born 1967), Italian association football goalkeeper
Wilma Gatta (born 1956), Italian alpine skier